Simon Roy is a Canadian comic book writer and artist. From 2012 to 2016 he was one of the artists and co-plotters on Brandon Graham's relaunch of Extreme Studios' Prophet.

Bibliography

Self-published on the web
The Cosmonauts (w/a, 2007)
Homesick (w/a, 2008)
Мотобол (w/a, 2008)
Shipwrecked with Dan the Gorilla (w/a):
 Originally an unfinished 24-hour webcomic, 2008.
 Redrawn and published at Study Group Comics, 2012.
Murder Book (tpb, 184 pages, Dark Horse, 2015) includes:
 "Catching Up" (a, with Ed Brisson, 2010)
 "Skimming the Till" (a, with Ed Brisson, 2010)
 Группа Крови (Blood Group) (w/a, 2010)
 Man in the 51st Millenium (w/a, 2010)
Barfight (w/a, for Arthur, 2010)
Homeward Bound (w/a, for Study Group Comics, 2012)
8.30 AM, April 3rd 1996 (w/a, for Study Group Comics, 2012)

Image Comics
Prophet (w/a, with Brandon Graham (comics) and various artists, Extreme Studios, 2012–2016) collected as:
 Remission (collects #21-26, tpb, 136 pages, 2012)
 Brothers (collects #27-31 and 33, tpb, 172 pages, 2013)
 Empire (collects #32 and 34-38, tpb, 128 pages, 2014)
 Joining (collects #39-45 and Strikefile #1-2, tpb, 168 pages, 2015)
 Earth War (collects Earth War #1-6, tpb, 168 pages, 2016)
Jan's Atomic Heart and Other Stories (104 pages, 2014).
The Field #1-4 (a, with Ed Brisson, 2014) collected as The Field (tpb, 104 pages, 2014)
Island #2, 5, 8: "Habitat" (w/a, anthology, 2015–2016) collected as Habitat (tpb, 96 pages, 2016)
Thought Bubble Anthology #5: "Songs" (a, with Brandon Graham, 2017)
Protector (Later renamed to First Knife) (w, with Daniel Bensen and Artyom Trakhanov, 136 pages, 2020)

Other publishers
Jan's Atomic Heart (w/a):
 Originally a graphic novel from New Reliable Press (48 pages, 2009).
 Reprinted by Image in Jan's Atomic Heart and Other Stories (104 pages, 2014).
Heavy Metal vol. 34 #9: "Good Business" (w/a, anthology, HM Communications, 2011)
Dark Horse:
Dark Horse Presents: "Tiger Lung" (w/a, with Jason Wordie, anthology):
 "Beneath the Ice" (in vol. 2 #21-23, 2013) collected as Tiger Lung (hc, 88 pages, 2014)
 "The Guide" (in vol. 3 #6, 2014)
 Originally an unfinished story called Dead Lands (2010).
Halo: Tales from the Slipspace: "Hunting Party" (with J. D. Goff, anthology graphic novel, 128 pages, 2016)
Think of a City page 43 (w/a, Internet art project, 2015)
Captain Canuck vol. 2 #5: "Double Star Crossed, Part One" (a, with Ed Brisson, co-feature, Chapter House, 2015)
2000 AD #2053: "Judge Dredd: Adaptive Optics" (a, with Arthur Wyatt, anthology, Rebellion, 2017)
Star Trek: Waypoint #5: "Come Away, Child" (w/a, co-feature, IDW Publishing, 2017)
Cayrels Ring #1, 3 (a, with Shannon Lentz and various artists, Kickstarter, 2018–2019)

Covers only
Godzilla: The Half-Century War #5 (IDW Publishing, 2013)
Sabertooth Swordsman #5 (Dark Horse, 2013)
Panels for Primates #1 (Monkeybrain, 2013)
Undertow #1 (Image, 2014)
Spread #1 (Image, 2014)
Cluster #1 (Boom! Studios, 2015)
Ancient Noise #1 (Kickstarter, 2016)
Robotech #8 (Titan, 2018)
The Spider King #3 (IDW Publishing, 2018)
The Season of the Snake #1 (Statix Press, 2018)
The Gravediggers Union #7 (Image, 2018)

References

Interviews

External links

Year of birth missing (living people)
Living people
Canadian comics artists